California's 74th State Assembly district is one of 80 California State Assembly districts. It is currently represented by Democrat Cottie Petrie-Norris of Laguna Beach.

District profile 
The district encompasses coastal central Orange County. Anchored by Irvine, the district is primarily suburban and affluent.

Orange County – 15.6%
 Costa Mesa
 Huntington Beach – 49.4%
 Irvine – 66.0%
 Laguna Beach 
 Laguna Woods 
 Newport Beach

Election results from statewide races

List of Assembly Members 
Due to redistricting, the 74th district has been moved around different parts of the state. The current iteration resulted from the 2011 redistricting by the California Citizens Redistricting Commission.

Election results 1992 - present

2020

2018

2016

2014

2012

2010

2008

2006

2004

2002

2000

1998

1996

1994

1992

See also 
 California State Assembly
 California State Assembly districts
 Districts in California

References

External links 
 District map from the California Citizens Redistricting Commission

74
Government in Orange County, California
Costa Mesa, California
Huntington Beach, California
Irvine, California
Laguna Beach, California
Newport Beach, California